Timothy Andrew Barnett (born 4 August 1958) is a New Zealand politician who was the member of the New Zealand House of Representatives for Christchurch Central from 1996 to 2008, representing the Labour Party. He is a British immigrant to New Zealand and New Zealand's second openly gay politician. Barnett moved to South Africa in 2009 to work in the field of HIV/AIDS. He returned to New Zealand in 2012 when he was appointed by the Labour Party as their general secretary.

Early life
Born in Rugby, Warwickshire, England, on 4 August 1958, he moved to New Zealand in 1991 with his former partner, Jonathan Kirkpatrick. Educated at the London School of Economics, graduating with a B.Sc. (Honours) in Economics (Government) in 1981. In the United Kingdom he had been the inaugural executive director of the Stonewall Lobby Group, which was the first professional lobby group set up in that country to work for equal rights for lesbian and gay people.

Member of Parliament

He was elected to Parliament as the Member of Parliament (MP) for Christchurch Central in 1996. He has been active in many community-based organisations in New Zealand, including the lesbian, gay and transgender (LGBT) section of the Labour Party, (Rainbow Labour) which he helped to found in 1997, and is a supporter of UniQ, the Queer Students Association at New Zealand universities. He was the Parliamentary promoter of the Prostitution Law Reform Bill, a Bill in his name, which became law in 2003 and thus made New Zealand the first country in the world to decriminalise prostitution, and an outspoken supporter of the Civil Union Bill, which became law in 2004 and made New Zealand the first country outside Europe to legislate for equal relationship status for lesbian and gay couples. He was appointed Senior Government Whip after the 2005 election. He was known to be very active in his local electorate chairing a Youth Advisory Committee as well as being a regular contributor to the St Albans Neighbourhood News.

At the 2005 general election, Barnett was re-elected with 52.35% of the vote and a majority of 6,694. He retired at the 2008 general election.

After Parliament
Barnett was appointed as the global programmes manager for the World AIDS Campaign in February 2009 and was based in Cape Town, South Africa.

In July 2012, Barnett returned to New Zealand and was appointed as general secretary of the Labour Party.

In October 2015, Barnett was appointed to the iwi tribal authority of the Ngai Tuhoe as the Group Manager for Iwi (Tribe) based at the Southern Hemisphere's largest living building, Te Uru Taumatua, in Taneatua.  In that role Barnett held the portfolio's Health, Housing, Education and Social Well-Being. Barnett resided in the rural township of Ruatoki during that period.

In June 2017, Barnett become the CEO of FinCap (The National Building Financial Capability Trust), a new nationwide organisation dedicated to serving and strengthening New Zealand's network of financial capability and budget advice agencies. Those local services support people facing urgent and deep financial problems to manage their debts and successfully find ways forward. FinCap  has a network of 200 agencies throughout NZ and works with government and NGOs on a range of issues that aims to change of landscape of harm that debt and other associated factors has on the well being of all New Zealanders.

To date, Barnett also supports and assist with iwi governance strategic planning as an advisor and a mentor to Members of the New Zealand Parliament.

Further reading

Barnett's contribution is a paper entitled: "Law reform and politicians."

Barnett's contribution is a paper entitled: "Human rights and New Zealand law."

Barnett is one of eighteen people profiled in this volume.

Barnett's contribution is a paper entitled: "Political and legal environments."

References

External links
 Tim Barnett's website (archived)
 Former Members of New Zealand Parliament page

|-

|-

1958 births
Living people
English emigrants to New Zealand
Naturalised citizens of New Zealand
Gay politicians
New Zealand gay writers
New Zealand Labour Party MPs
New Zealand bloggers
People from Rugby, Warwickshire
LGBT members of the Parliament of New Zealand
New Zealand MPs for Christchurch electorates
Members of the New Zealand House of Representatives
Alumni of the London School of Economics
21st-century New Zealand politicians
Male bloggers
Prostitution in New Zealand